The Australian women's cricket team toured England between May and August 1951. The test series against England women's cricket team was played for the Women's Ashes, which Australia were defending. The series was drawn 1–1, meaning that Australia retained the Ashes.

Squads

Tour Matches

Single innings matches

Two innings matches

Test Series

1st Test

2nd Test

3rd Test

References

External links
Australia Women tour of England 1951 from Cricinfo

The Women's Ashes
Women's cricket tours of England
Australia women's national cricket team tours